Sony Kwame Owusu (born July 6, 1991), known professionally as Kayso (styled as KaySo), From Tema or Beat Nyame, is a Ghanaian record producer, and recording artist from Ashanti Region. KaySo has produced singles for a number of well known artists in diverse genres, ranging from Hip Hop, Afrobeats, R&B, Afroswing, Hiplife and Highlife. Artists KaySo has worked with include Becca, Kwesi Arthur, KiDi, Sarkodie, Medikal, Ice Prince, Darkovibes, $pacely, Kofi Mole, Dj Mic Smith, Kirani Ayat, Wiyaala, Stonebwoy, Blaqbonez, Pappy Kojo, Cina Soul, Mugeez, Offei and Magnom.

Early life and music career 
Kayso produced the single "Grind Day" by Kwesi Arthur and the remix which featured Sarkodie and Medikal. The song won "Hiphop Song Of The Year" award at the 2018 Vodafone Ghana Music Awards. He also produced KiDi's song "Say Cheese" which featured Teddy Riley.

Production credits

Discography

Award and nominations

References 

Living people
Ghanaian record producers
21st-century Ghanaian musicians
People from Tema
1991 births